Laura Spong (February 20, 1926 – August 13, 2018) was an American painter, who in her later years became one of South Carolina's leading non-objective artists.

Early life and education
Laura Alice Miles was born in Nashville, Tennessee, one of three daughters of Thomas Edwin Miles, Sr. and Mary Jared Bryan. She graduated cum laude from Vanderbilt University, where she majored in English and first took drawing classes, in 1948, married later that year, and moved with her husband to Columbia, South Carolina. Between 1949 and 1959 Spong had six children.

Career
Beginning in the mid-1950s Spong took art classes at the Richland Art School of the Columbia Museum of Art. Among her instructors there were J. Bardin and Gil Petroff, two of the modern artists who introduced New York School paradigms to mid-century Columbia. Spong became a member of the Columbia Artists' Guild and in 1957 was one of three winners of the guild's spring exhibition at the Columbia Museum of Art. From that year Spong was an active member of the Columbia art community, her work often recognized by inclusion in juried exhibitions and awards in the region. After her husband's death in 1973, Spong worked for the Columbia Department of Parks and Recreation for ten years, but continued to paint and exhibit. It was not until the mid to late-1980s, however, that Spong became a full-time artist. She took a studio space at Vista Studios in downtown Columbia in 1991. She was enormously productive thereafter, with her work seen in many solo and group exhibitions, receiving awards, and being acquired for public and private collections. She was active to the end of her life, completing works shortly before her death.

Work
From the beginning of her career, Spong worked mostly in a vernacular associated with Abstract Expressionism. Her mature style developed gradually, moving away from geometric to more organic gesture in the late 1980s and early 1990s. According to Mary Bentz Gilkerson, Spong's mature work has more affinity with the paintings of Robert Motherwell and Joan Mitchell, than with Jackson Pollock. "Line in her work," according to Gilkerson, "moves between calligraphic and pictographic, alluding to, without ever specifying, representational images."

Selected exhibitions
“Laura Spong: Fragments of the Whole.” University of South Carolina, Sumter, 2000
"In Retrospect: Laura Spong, 1950-2006." McMaster Gallery, University of South Carolina, Columbia, 2006
"Laura Spong." Francis Marion University, Florence, SC, 2007
"Laura Spong." Spartanburg Art Museum
“Abstract Art in South Carolina, 1949-2012.” South Carolina State Museum, 2012
"Laura Spong: Paintings." Young Harris College, Young Harris, GA, 2012
"Stalwarts: Carl Blair & Laura Spong." Florence County Museum, Florence, SC, 2012
"Independent Spirits: Women Artists of South Carolina." Columbia Museum of Art, 2015
"Laura Spong: Once in a Green Moon." Sumter County Gallery of Art, Sumter, SC, 2017-2018

Awards and recognition
Elizabeth O’Neill Verner Award for lifetime achievement in the arts, SC Arts Commission, 2017

Public collections
Columbia Museum of Art
South Carolina State Museum
Greenville County Museum of Art

Selected private, corporate, and institutional collections
The Johnson Collection, Spartanburg
The Medical University of South Carolina, Charleston
Midlands Technical College, Columbia
Metropolitan Convention Center, Columbia
South Carolina Arts Commission

References

Further reading
Roefs, Wim, ed. (2011). Laura Spong, 2006-2011: Age as an Administrative Device. Columbia SC: if ART Gallery
Roefs, Wim, ed. (2016). Laura Spong at 90: Six Decades in Painting. Columbia SC: if ART Gallery

External links
Laura Spong, American, 1926-2018

1926 births
2018 deaths
20th-century American painters
Painters from South Carolina
People from Nashville, Tennessee
People from Columbia, South Carolina
American women painters
20th-century American women artists
Vanderbilt University alumni
Painters from Tennessee
21st-century American women artists